Tina Marie Thompson (born February 10, 1975) is an American former WNBA professional basketball player and coach. Most recently, she served as the head coach of the Virginia Cavaliers women's basketball team from 2018 to 2022. Thompson was inducted into both the Women's Basketball Hall of Fame and the Naismith Memorial Basketball Hall of Fame in 2018.

The first college draft pick in WNBA history, Thompson was selected first by the Houston Comets. She helped lead the Comets to four consecutive WNBA Championships in 1997, 1998, 1999, and 2000. She won two Olympic gold medals and made nine WNBA All-Star Game appearances.

Early years
Thompson was born in Los Angeles, California. She grew up playing basketball with her brother TJ and his friends at Robertson Park in West Los Angeles, California. She recorded more than 1,500 points and 1,000 rebounds in her high school career at Morningside High School in Inglewood, California, where she also played volleyball. She then went on to play basketball at the University of Southern California, where she graduated in 1997. She attended both high school and college with fellow WNBA player Lisa Leslie.

USC statistics
Source

USA Basketball
Thompson represented the US at the 1995 World University Games held in Fukuoka, Japan, in August and September 1995. The team had a record of 5–1, securing the silver medal. The USA team won early and reached a record of 5–0 when the USA beat Yugoslavia. In the semi-final game, the USA faced Russia. The team was behind much of the first half but tied the game at the half. The USA broke the game open in the second half and won, 101–74. The gold medal match was against unbeaten Italy. The Italian team started strong, scoring 12 of the first 14 points of the contest. Sylvia Crawley scored eight consecutive points to end the first half, but that left the USA nine points behind. The USA took a small lead in the second half, but the team from Italy responded with a ten-point run, and won the game and the gold medal by a score of 73–65. Thompson averaged 9.9 points per game and was second on the team with 7.3 rebounds per game.

Thompson was invited to be a member of the Jones Cup team representing the US in 1996. She helped the team to a 9–0 record, and the gold medal in the event. In the game against Slovakia, which would determine the gold medal, she combined with teammate Michelle M. Marciniak to score 30 points in a game they had to come from behind to win 72–62. Thompson averaged 9.6 points per game and 6.2 rebounds, both second highest on the team.

Thompson was selected to be a member of the National team for 1998 World Championships, but was injured and unable to compete.

Thompson was named to the national team representing the US at the 2006 World Championships, held in Barueri and Sao Paulo, Brazil. The team won eight of their nine contests, but the lone loss came in the semifinal medal round to Russia. The USA beat Brazil in the final game to earn the bronze medal. Thompson led all scorers with 14.4 points per game. In a game against Russia, she tied a team record by hitting four of four three-point attempts.

Thompson also played for Team USA in the 2004 and 2008 Summer Olympics, winning two Olympic gold medals with the team.

WNBA career
Thompson was selected No. 1 overall in the first round of the inaugural 1997 WNBA draft by the Houston Comets. There, she was a member of a dynasty along with Sheryl Swoopes and Cynthia Cooper that won four consecutive WNBA championships from 1997 to 2000. During her stint with the Comets, Thompson had won All-Star MVP honors at the 2000 WNBA All-Star Game, led all Western Conference players in All-Star voting in 2001, had been named to the All-WNBA First Team three times (1997, 1998, 2004) and All-WNBA Second Team four times (1999, 2000, 2001, 2002).

Prior to the 2005 season, Thompson had given birth to Dyllan Thompson-Jones, her first child in May, with then NBA player Damon Jones being the biological father; she resumed playing with the Comets two months later. Following her pregnancy she had a sluggish season in 2005, averaging only 10.1 ppg.

In 2006, Thompson returned to peak condition, averaging 18.7 ppg and scored a career-high 37 points in a triple-overtime loss to the Phoenix Mercury. That year the Comets made the playoffs for the final time before folding, after they were eliminated in a two-game sweep by the Sacramento Monarchs in the first round.

After the Comets folded in 2008, Thompson signed with her hometown team, the Los Angeles Sparks in 2009, playing alongside Candace Parker and Lisa Leslie who was playing in her final year before retirement. Thompson, Leslie and Parker led the Sparks to the playoffs with an 18–16 record. In the playoffs, Thompson was one win away from her fifth Finals appearance but the Sparks lost 2–1 in the second round to the Phoenix Mercury, who were the champions that year. During the following season in August, Thompson became the WNBA's all-time leading scorer, passing Lisa Leslie during a regular-season game loss to the San Antonio Silver Stars in which she scored 23 points. In 2011, she was voted in by fans as one of the top 15 players in the fifteen-year history of the WNBA.

An unrestricted free agent at the end of the 2011 season, Thompson signed with the Seattle Storm on February 27, 2012, to fill gaps left by Australia's Lauren Jackson, concurrent her commitment to the Australian national team for the 2012 Olympics, and small forward Swin Cash, who was traded to the Chicago Sky as part of a package deal for the second-overall pick in the 2012 WNBA Draft.

On May 31, 2013, Thompson announced that she would retire from the WNBA at the end of the 2013 season.

During the 2013 season, the 38-year-old Thompson was a starter for the Storm and had averaged 14.1 ppg. She was also selected to the 2013 WNBA All-Star Game to replace an injured Brittney Griner. It was her ninth career WNBA All-Star Game appearance, the second-most in WNBA history, and it also made her the first and only player in WNBA history to be named an All-Star in three different decades.

On August 17, 2013, Thompson became the first WNBA player to have 7,000 points and 3,000 rebounds following a victory against the Indiana Fever where she scored 23 points and grabbed 7 rebounds.

September 14, 2013, marked the final regular-season game of Thompson's career which resulted in a victory over the Tulsa Shock. Following the game, an almost hour-long retirement ceremony took place in her honor. Her Storm teammates all wore a number 7 jersey either in a Comets or Storm variant. Despite the absence of Sue Bird who sat out the whole season while recovering from knee surgery, the Storm made the playoffs with the number 4 seed in the Western Conference.

Thompson's final WNBA career game was Game 2 of the first round in the 2013 WNBA Playoffs. The Storm were eliminated in a two-game sweep by the Minnesota Lynx who would win the championship that year. Thompson scored 13 points in the loss.

In 2016, Thompson was again honored by the WNBA, being named in the WNBA Top 20@20 in celebration of the league's twentieth anniversary.

On March 31, 2018, Thompson was named to the 2018 class of inductees for the Naismith Memorial Basketball Hall of Fame.

WNBA career statistics

Regular season

|-
|style="text-align:left;background:#afe6ba;"| 1997†
| align="left" | Houston
| 28 || 28 || 31.6 || .418 || .370 || .838 || 6.6 || 1.1 || 0.8 || 1.0 || 2.2 || 13.2
|-
|style="text-align:left;background:#afe6ba;"| 1998†
| align="left" | Houston
| 27 || 27 || 32.4 || .419 || .359 || .851 || 7.1 || 0.9 || 1.2 || 0.9 || 1.7 || 12.7
|-
|style="text-align:left;background:#afe6ba;"| 1999†
| align="left" | Houston
| 32 || 32 || 33.6 || .419 || .351 || .782 || 6.4 || 0.9 || 1.0 || 1.0 || 2.2 || 12.2
|-
|style="text-align:left;background:#afe6ba;"| 2000†
| align="left" | Houston
| 32 || 32 || 34.0 || .469 || .417 || .837 || 7.7 || 1.5 || 1.5 || 0.8 || 2.6 || 16.9
|-
| align="left" | 2001
| align="left" | Houston
| 30 || 30 || 36.7 || .377 || .293 || .840 || 7.8 || 1.9 || 1.0 || 0.7 || 2.9 || 19.3
|-
| align="left" | 2002
| align="left" | Houston
| 29 || 29 || 36.3 || .431 || .370 || .823 || 7.5 || 2.1 || 0.9 || 0.7 || 3.1 || 16.7
|-
| align="left" | 2003
| align="left" | Houston
| 28 || 28 || 34.8 || .413 || .342 || .779 || 5.9 || 1.7 || 0.6 || 0.8 || 2.4 || 16.9
|-
| align="left" | 2004
| align="left" | Houston
| 26 || 26 || style="background:#D3D3D3"|36.3° || .402 || .407 || .789 || 6.0 || 1.8 || 0.8 || 0.9 || 2.6 || 20.0
|-
| align="left" | 2005
| align="left" | Houston
| 15 || 15 || 29.3 || .413 || .300 || .762 || 3.8 || 1.5 || 0.8 || 0.3 || 2.1 || 10.1
|-
| align="left" | 2006
| align="left" | Houston
| 21 || 21 || 33.1 || .457 || .417 || .804 || 5.6 || 2.2 || 1.0 || 0.6 || 2.4 || 18.7
|-
| align="left" | 2007
| align="left" | Houston
| 34 || 34 || style="background:#D3D3D3"|36.3° || .420 || .400 || .834 || 6.7 || 2.8 || 0.9 || 0.7 || 3.2 || 18.8
|-
| align="left" | 2008
| align="left" | Houston
| 30 || 29 || style="background:#D3D3D3"|35.8° || .413 || .406 || .859 || 6.9 || 2.2 || 1.1 || 0.7 || 3.7 || 18.1
|-
| align="left" | 2009
| align="left" | Los Angeles
| 34 || 34 || 34.8 || .385 || .369 || .867 || 5.9 || 2.3 || 0.8 || 0.7 || 2.7 || 13.0
|-
| align="left" | 2010
| align="left" | Los Angeles
| 33 || 33 || 33.2 || .446 || .352 || .872 || 6.2 || 1.8 || 1.2 || 0.7 || 2.3 || 16.6
|-
| align="left" | 2011
| align="left" | Los Angeles
| 34 || 33 || 25.0 || .386 || .339 || .833 || 4.6 || 1.1 || 1.2 || 0.7 || 2.0 || 9.9
|-
| align="left" | 2012
| align="left" | Seattle
| 29 || 5 || 19.0 || .442 || .427 || .833 || 3.4 || 0.5 || 0.5 || 0.8 || 1.2 || 8.9
|-
| align="left" | 2013
| align="left" | Seattle
|34 || 34 || 28.7 || .410 || .370 || .874 || 5.8 || 1.1 || 0.5 || 0.6 || 1.4 || 14.1
|-
| align="left" | Career
| align="left" |17 years, 3 teams
| 496 || 470 || 32.4 || .418 || .371 || .832 || 6.2 || 1.6 || 0.9 || 0.8 || 2.4 || 15.1

Postseason

|-
|style="text-align:left;background:#afe6ba;"| 1997†
| align="left" | Houston
| 2 || 2 || 37.0 || .429 || .400 || .600 || 9.0 || 1.5 || 1.0 || 0.5 || 3.0 || 13.0
|-
|style="text-align:left;background:#afe6ba;"| 1998†
| align="left" | Houston
| 5 || 5 || 37.2 || .408 || .350 || .917 || 9.2 || 1.2 || 1.4 || 0.8 || 1.6 || 11.6
|-
|style="text-align:left;background:#afe6ba;"| 1999†
| align="left" | Houston
| 6 || 6 || 34.7 || .368 || .375 || .762 || 5.0 || 0.7 || 0.8 || 1.2 || 2.1 || 11.2
|-
|style="text-align:left;background:#afe6ba;"| 2000†
| align="left" | Houston
| 6 || 6 || 38.8 || .403 || .391 || .944 || 8.0 || 1.7 || 0.8 || 0.8 || 1.6 || 12.7
|-
| align="left" | 2001
| align="left" | Houston
| 2 || 2 || 34.0 || .550 || .600 || .800 || 6.0 || 3.5 || 0.5 || 0.0 || 5.0 || 14.5
|-
| align="left" | 2002
| align="left" | Houston
| 3 || 3 || style="background:#D3D3D3"|42.7° || .364 || .333 || .700 || 8.0 || 1.3 || 2.0 || 1.0 || 0.6 || 14.3
|-
| align="left" | 2003
| align="left" | Houston
| 3 || 3 || 35.3 || .391 || .231 || .857 || 4.7 || 1.7 || 0.7 || 2.0 || 2.0 || 15.0
|-
| align="left" | 2005
| align="left" | Houston
| 5 || 5 || 33.6 || .491 || .300 || .714 || 5.6 || 1.2 || 0.4 || 1.2 || 1.8 || 13.8
|-
| align="left" | 2006
| align="left" | Houston
| 2 || 2 || 31.5 || .381 || .400 || 1.000 || 2.5 || 1.5 || 1.0 || 0.5 || 2.5 || 13.5
|-
| align="left" | 2009
| align="left" | Los Angeles
| 6 || 6 || 36.3 || .378 || .462 || .958 || 7.0 || 2.8 || 0.8 || 0.7 || 2.5 || 15.2
|-
| align="left" | 2010
| align="left" | Los Angeles
| 2 || 2 || style="background:#D3D3D3"|39.0° || .333 || .286 || 1.000 || 6.0 || 3.0 || 1.5 || 2.0 || 1.5 || 17.0
|-
| align="left" | 2012
| align="left" | Seattle
| 3 || 0 || 17.0 || .364 || .333 || .500 || 6.7 || 0.0 || 0.0 || 0.0 || 1.3 || 7.0
|-
| align="left" | 2013
| align="left" | Seattle
| 2 || 2 || 32.6 || .423 || .000 || .500 || 8.5 || 0.0 || 1.0 || 0.0 || 2.0 || 11.5
|-
| align="left" | Career
| align="left" |13 years, 3 teams
| 47 || 44 || 35.0 || .403 || .355 || .838 || 6.7 || 1.5 || 0.9 || 0.9 || 2.0 || 13.0

International career
Thompson was an alternate for the 2000 Olympic squad. Thompson was a member of the U.S. women's basketball team and she earned a gold medal at the Summer Olympic Games: Beijing 2008. She was named to the 1998 and 2002 USA World Championship teams, but injuries kept her from both competitions. She earned her gold medal in 2004 in Greece.

Thompson has also participated in other professional leagues overseas. Following the 2001 WNBA season, Thompson played for Rovereto Basket in Rovereto, Italy, and in 2003 she played for the Kumho Falcons of the Women's Korea Basketball League (WKBL).

Coaching career
On March 18, 2015, the University of Texas at Austin athletic department announced Thompson's hire as an assistant coach for the Longhorn women's basketball team, beginning her collegiate coaching career. Two years later, Thompson was promoted to Associate Head Coach with the Lady Longhorns.

After three seasons with the Lady Longhorns, Thompson was named head coach of the Virginia Cavaliers women's basketball program on April 16, 2018. She was hired by the first African American female athletics director of any power conference university, Carla Williams. On March 3, 2022, the university announced that Thompson had been relieved of her duties after going 30-63 during her tenure.

Head Coaching Record

Overseas
 2001–2002:  Rovereto Basket
 2003:  Incheon Kumho Life Falcons
 2005–2006:  Cheonan Kookmin Bank Savers 
 2006–2007:  Spartak Moscow Region
 2010:  Municipal MCM Târgovişte
 2012–2013:  Chuncheon Woori Bank Hansae
 2013–2014:  Guri KDB Life Winnus

Awards and achievements
 4-time WNBA Championship
 2-time Olympic gold medalist
 2000 WNBA All-Star selection (MVP)
 9-time WNBA All-Star selection
 Named to the All-WNBA team 8 times
 Member of the WNBA All-Decade Team
 1st in WNBA all-time scoring

See also
 List of WNBA career rebounding leaders

References

Citations

Sources

External links

USA Basketball Profile
Tina Thompson's U.S. Olympic Team bio

1975 births
Living people
African-American basketball players
African-American basketball coaches
All-American college women's basketball players
American expatriate basketball people in Italy
American expatriate basketball people in Romania
American expatriate basketball people in Russia
American expatriate basketball people in South Korea
American women's basketball coaches
American women's basketball players
Basketball players at the 2004 Summer Olympics
Basketball players at the 2008 Summer Olympics
Basketball players from Los Angeles
Club Sportiv Municipal Târgoviște players
Houston Comets players
Los Angeles Sparks players
Medalists at the 2004 Summer Olympics
Medalists at the 2008 Summer Olympics
Naismith Memorial Basketball Hall of Fame inductees
Olympic gold medalists for the United States in basketball
Power forwards (basketball)
Seattle Storm players
Texas Longhorns women's basketball coaches
Universiade medalists in basketball
Universiade silver medalists for the United States
USC Trojans women's basketball players
Virginia Cavaliers women's basketball coaches
Women's Korean Basketball League players
Women's National Basketball Association All-Stars
Medalists at the 1995 Summer Universiade
21st-century African-American sportspeople
21st-century African-American women
20th-century African-American sportspeople
20th-century African-American women
United States women's national basketball team players